Shichahai  is a station on Line 8 of the Beijing Subway. The station opened on December 28, 2013.

The station is named after Shichahai, a scenic area in Beijing.

Station Layout 
The station has an underground island platform.

Exits 
There are 3 exits, lettered A1, A2, and C. Exit C is accessible.

Gallery

References

External links 

Railway stations in China opened in 2013
Beijing Subway stations in Xicheng District
Beijing Subway stations in Dongcheng District